Grove High School may refer to:

U.S states A–K 
 Beech Grove High School in Indiana
 Boone Grove High School in Indiana
 Buffalo Grove High School in Illinois
 Cary-Grove High School in Illinois
 Council Grove High School in Kansas
 Downers Grove North High School in Illinois
 Eagle Grove High School in Iowa
 Garden Grove High School in California
 Pacific Grove High School in California
 Prairie Grove High School in Arkansas
 The Grove School in California
 Union Grove High School in Georgia
 Walden Grove High School in Arizona
 Western Grove High School in Arkansas

U.S. states M–Z 
 Avon Grove High School in Pennsylvania
 Blooming Grove High School in Texas
 Cedar Grove-Belgium High School in Wisconsin
 Coal Grove High School in Ohio
 Columbus Grove High School in Ohio
 Cottage Grove High School in Oregon
 Fair Grove High School in Missouri
 Forest Grove High School in Oregon
 Grove City High School in Ohio
 Grove High School in Oklahoma
 Howards Grove High School in Wisconsin
 Lone Grove High School in Oklahoma
 Maple Grove Junior High School in Minnesota
 Maple Grove Senior High School in Minnesota
 Monona Grove High School in Wisconsin
 Penns Grove High School in New Jersey

Elsewhere 
 Golden Grove High School in South Australia
 Hazel Grove High School in England
 King's Grove High School in England
 Lynn Grove High School in England
 Walnut Grove Secondary School in British Columbia, Canada

See also 
 
 Grove School (disambiguation)
 Groves High School (disambiguation)